Tore Jarl Ryen (born 30 December 1946) is a Norwegian revue and television writer.

He is behind several sitcoms aired on TV 2. Mot i brøstet, Karl & Co and Karl III starred Nils Vogt as "Karl Reverud"; in addition Ryen created Holms and Radio 2. He won a Gullruten award in 2001.

He is the father of Adam Ryen.

References

1946 births
Living people
Television people from Oslo
Norwegian television writers
TV 2 (Norway) people